The Cape Verde women's national volleyball team represents Cape Verde in international women's volleyball competitions and friendly matches.

References

External links
Cape Verde Volleyball Association

National women's volleyball teams
Volleyball
Volleyball in Cape Verde
Women's sport in Cape Verde